Rowland Brotherhood (or sometimes Roland Brotherhood) was a British engineer.  He was born in Middlesex in 1812 and died in Bristol in 1883.  He married Priscilla Penton in 1835 and they had 14 children, one also called Rowland who played cricket for Gloucestershire, another called Peter. Most were engineers.

Career
From 1835 he took on a number of contracts for building parts of the Great Western Railway (GWR).  By 1838 he was resident in Reading, Berkshire, and continued to do contract work for the GWR.

In 1841 he moved to Chippenham, Wiltshire, bought Orwell House on New Road, and took over a blacksmith's business. Soon after, he began production of railway fittings and developed an iron works on land north of Chippenham station. The business expanded in the 1850s and 1860s, with more land purchased to the north and east. Contract work for the GWR continued until 1861 when there was a dispute with that company; from 1861 to 1869 Brotherhood built components for railways and bridges across the British Empire, together with wagons and a small number of locomotives.

Activity at the Chippenham Works declined in the mid-1860s, and in 1869 it closed with extensive financial losses incurred by Brotherhood. The Works remained empty until the 1890s when the site was bought by Saxby and Farmer, railway signalling manufacturers, later becoming the Westinghouse Brake and Signal Company.

Brotherhood left Chippenham in 1868 and was appointed general manager of the Bute Ironworks in Cardiff.  In 1874 he moved to Bristol and in 1875 he took a contract to build a goods shed for the GWR. From 1877 to 1879 Brotherhood assisted his son, also called Rowland, in sinking shafts for the Severn Tunnel.

Rowland Brotherhood (senior) died at his home in Bristol on 4 March 1883, and is buried there in Arnos Vale Cemetery.

See also
Peter Brotherhood – engineering firm owned by his son and descendants

Sources

External links
 Chippenham Museum and Heritage Centre website

1812 births
1883 deaths
19th-century British engineers
English engineers
People from Middlesex (before 1889)